Disney's Sing Me a Story with Belle is an American live-action/animated television series created by Patrick Davidson and Melissa Gould. The series features Belle from the 1991 film Beauty and the Beast, who now owns and manages the bookshop in the village.  She is usually greeted by children who would like to hear a story. Belle interacts with the children and narrates vintage Disney animated shorts while doing activities around the bookstore. The series premiered on September 8, 1995, on Disney Channel.

Development
According to Ken Weiner, vice president at Buena Vista Television, using vintage Disney animated shorts allows the show to present a higher quality of animation than would normally be feasible in an educational show that would meet the Federal Communications Commission's E/I standards.

By early 1995, it was said that the show would present two short films per episode (with updated music and voices), which Belle and the children would sometimes interrupt for discussion purposes or to "test cognitive abilities".

Plot
Belle (Lynsey McLeod) lives in France and owns her own book and music shop after marrying her Prince. Helping her at the bookstore are Lewis and Carroll, two magical bookworms, Harmony the Cat and Big Book, a large talking book on a book stand. The bookstore is visited by local children to whom Belle will sing songs and tell stories, usually with a moral relating to something that's happened that day. The show's format bears resemblance to the Adventures in Wonderland in nature.

Clips from vintage Disney cartoons would often be used to illustrate the stories, including:

 Mickey's Rival
 The Cookie Carnival
 Goliath II
 Winnie the Pooh and the Honey Tree
 Music Land

Cast
 Lynsey McLeod - Belle from Beauty and the Beast
 Tim Goodwin - Brioche
 Jacob Chase - Jacob
 Kirsten Storms - Kirsten
 Shawn Pyfrom - Shawn
 Hampton Dixon - 'Little' Hampton
 Jennefer Jesse - Jennefer
 Natalie Trott - Natalie
 Julie Vanlue - Julie
 Kerry Anne Bradford - Kerry Anne
 Chris Robles - Chris
 J. J. Ward - J. J.
 Lindsay Louie - Lindsay
 Trevor Mann - Trevor
 Holly Arnstein - Holly
 Victoria Gregson - Victoria
 Justin Chapman - Justin
 Crysta Macalush - Crysta
 Faryn Einhorn - Faryn
 Corey Hayes - Corey
 Thea Cabreros - Thea
 Kristian Truelsen - Uncle Zack
 Wolf Bauer - Gaston (1 episode, "What's Inside Counts")
 Cyndi Vicino - Inez
 Mary Pat Gleason - Madame Soufflé
 Lindsey Alley - Miss Woohoo

Voices
 Mary Kay Bergman - Fifi, Hansel & Gretel, Elf, Witch
 Christine Cavanaugh - Carroll the Book Worm
 Jeff Conover - Harmony the Cat
 Jim Cummings - Big Book, Lewis the Book Worm
 Wayne Allwine - Mickey Mouse
 Tony Anselmo - Donald Duck
 Bill Farmer - Goofy, Pluto, Practical Pig
 Russi Taylor - Minnie Mouse
 Maurice LaMarche - Mortimer Mouse, Joe Giraffe
 Tress MacNeille - Lambs, Tillie Tiger
 Corey Burton - Ghosts
 Will Ryan - Willie the Giant

Episodes (including featured animated subjects)

Syndication
This series premiered in First-run syndication in select markets as a sneak preview on September 8, 1995. In 1996, two videos featuring two episodes each were released as part of the Disney Princess Collection: Chapters of Enchantment and Beauty and the World of Music. In 1999, two episodes from the first season were released with an episode of an abandoned Beauty and the Beast cartoon series featured in the 1998 video Belle's Magical World, and were released direct-to-video as Belle's Tales of Friendship.

Two episodes were also featured separately as an extra in both the 2011 re-release of Beauty and the Beast: The Enchanted Christmas, and Belle's Magical World.

References

External links 

 Sing Me A Story With Belle official webpage via the Internet Archive Wayback Machine
 Sing Me A Story With Belle clips via the Internet Archive Wayback Machine
 
 Retrojunk section on Sing Me A Story With Belle, includes video of the opening sequence

Beauty and the Beast (franchise)
Disney Channel original programming
1990s American animated television series
1990s American children's television series
1990s American music television series
1995 American television series debuts
1997 American television series endings
American animated television spin-offs
American children's animated education television series
American children's animated fantasy television series
American children's animated musical television series
American television series with live action and animation
American television shows featuring puppetry
English-language television shows
First-run syndicated television programs in the United States
Reading and literacy television series
Television series about teenagers
Television series based on Disney films
Television series by Disney
Television shows based on fairy tales
Television shows set in France